HNLMS Van Nes may refer to following ships of the Royal Netherlands Navy:

 
 , an 
 , a 
 , a 

Royal Netherlands Navy ship names